Looking Back may refer to:

Books
Looking Back (book), an autobiography by Lois Lowry
Looking Back, a book by Ambeth Ocampo

Music
Looking Back (Tone Damli album) (2012)
Looking Back (John Mayall album), or its title song
Lookin' Back (Hank Locklin album), (1969)
Looking Back (Leon Russell album) (1973)
Looking Back (Toyah album) (1995)
Looking Back (Stevie Wonder album) (1977)
Looking Back (The Cherry Slush album)
Lookin' Back, a 2009 album by Bob Baldwin
Looking Back, an album by Cinderella
Lookin' Back, an album by The 4 Seasons
Lookin' Back, an album by  Ken Medema
Looking Back – The Best of Daryl Hall + John Oates (Daryl Hall and John Oates album) (1991)

Songs
"Looking Back" (Nat King Cole song), 1958
"Looking Back" (Aksel Kankaanranta song), 2020
"Lookin' Back", a 1971 song by Bob Seger
"Lookin' Back", a 1981 song by Rich Dodson
"Lookin' Back", a song by E-40 from Revenue Retrievin': Overtime Shift

See also
Lebensrückblick (Looking Back), a 1951 autobiography by Lou Andreas-Salomé